Seringia velutina (common name Velvet firebush) is a shrub in the Malvaceae family native to  Western Australia.

Taxonomy
This plant was first described in 1846 as Keraudrenia velutina by Joachim Steetz<ref name=apni>{{APNI2|id=102599|name=Seringia velutina}}</ref> but was moved to the genus Seringia by Ferdinand von Mueller in 1860.  In 2015, Carolyn Wilkins and Barbara Whitlock sank the genus Keraudrenia into Seringia, and the accepted name is now Seringia velutina''.

References

External links 
Seringia velutina occurrence data from the Australasian Virtual Herbarium

Eudicots of Western Australia
velutina
Taxa named by Ferdinand von Mueller
Plants described in 1846